This is a list of more important international treaties signed by Finland from 1917 onwards.

 Treaty of Tartu (1920) with Bolshevist Russia
 Arbitration on Åland (1921) by the League of Nations
 International treaties on Åland (1921)
 Soviet-Finnish non-aggression pact (1932)
 Moscow Peace Treaty (1940) with the Soviet Union - (obsolete)
 Moscow armistice (1944) with the Soviet Union - (many provisions considered obsolete with the dissolution of the Soviet Union)
 Paris Peace Treaty (1947) with the Soviet Union and the United Kingdom - (many provisions considered obsolete)
 Agreement of Friendship, Cooperation, and Mutual Assistance (1948) with the Soviet Union - (considered obsolete)
Helsinki Accords  (1975) with Conference on Security and Co-operation in Europe
 Treaty of Accession to the European union (1994)

See also 
History of Finland
List of Finnish wars
List of treaties

Treaties
Treaties
Treaties of Finland